Bernard Schultze (31 May 1915 in Schneidemühl, now Piła, Poland – 14 April 2005 in Cologne) was a German abstract painter who co-founded the Quadriga group of artists along with Karl Otto Götz and two other artists. On 7 July 1955 he married another painter named Ursula Bluhm.

Characterized by their gestural abstraction, Schultze's works regularly feature brilliant, fluorescent colors morphing in and out of implied representation, forming fantastical landscapes, figures, and languages.

Schultze's earlier works, produced before 1945, were destroyed as a result of a 1945 air raid on Berlin.

His work is included in the collections of the Museum Ludwig in Cologne, Germany, the Tate Museum, London, as well as the Museum of Modern Art, New York.  

His paintings are also part of the art collection of the  Hammerschmidt Villa in Bonn, Germany (the residence of the President of Germany until the mid-1990s).

References

External links 
 
Der Maler Bernard Schultze ist tot

1915 births
2005 deaths
People from Piła
People from the Province of Posen
20th-century German painters
20th-century German male artists
German male painters
21st-century German painters
21st-century German male artists
Officers Crosses of the Order of Merit of the Federal Republic of Germany